Eancé is a commune in the Ille-et-Vilaine department in Brittany in northwestern France.

Geography
The river Semnon flows northwest through the commune.

Population

Inhabitants of Eancé are called Éancéens in French.

See also
Communes of the Ille-et-Vilaine department

References

External links

Mayors of Ille-et-Vilaine Association 

Communes of Ille-et-Vilaine